Owen Williams (born 27 February 1992) is a Welsh professional rugby union player who plays as a fly-half for the Ospreys. He has represented Wales and Wales U20.

Club career 
Initially part of the Ospreys, Williams featured regularly in their under-16s and under-18s teams before being signed for the Scarlets in 2010.

At the end of the 2012–13 season Williams departed from the Scarlets and moved to Leicester Tigers. Following the departure of fly-halves George Ford and Ryan Lamb, to Bath and Worcester Warriors, before the start of the 2013–14 season and ex-England fly-half Toby Flood's poor run of form combining with his decision to depart at the end of the season for Toulouse, Williams established himself as the club's first choice outside half. Williams's fine form and key contributions helped propel an initially misfiring Leicester Tigers back into the top four of the Premiership and into the quarterfinals of the Heineken Cup. In the wake of Leicester's 22–16 away win over local rivals Northampton Saints, Williams collecting 17 points from the kicking tee, Leicester's Director of Rugby Richard Cockerill publicly advocated Williams's inclusion onto Wales's 2014 summer tour to South Africa.

On 5 January 2015, it was announced Williams had signed a new contract to stay at Leicester Tigers, despite speculation he would be returning to Wales to play for his former region the Scarlets and increase his chances of getting a Wales call-up.

On 11 January 2017, Williams would leave Leicester for Premiership rivals Gloucester Rugby from the 2017–18 season.

In June 2020 it was confirmed Williams had left Gloucester to join Japanese side Red Hurricanes. A club which is under the leadership of former Gloucester head coach Johan Ackermann.

On 28 April 2021, Williams would return to England to sign for Premiership side Worcester Warriors from the 2021-22 season. 

On 5 October 2022 all Worcester players had their contacts terminated due to the liquidation of the company to which they were contracted.

Following his release from Worcester, Williams joined the Ospreys on 6 December 2022, as injury cover heading into their European campaign. Williams made his Ospreys debut on 11 December 2022, coming off the bench against Leicester Tigers.

International career 
Williams featured in the Wales under-20 national team; helping Wales to third in the 2012 IRB Junior World Championship.

In May 2017 he was named in the Wales senior squad for the tests against Tonga and Samoa in June 2017. He made his debut coming off the bench against Tonga on 16 June 2017.

Williams was again selected by Wales for the 2017 Autumn Internationals. Williams started against both Australia and New Zealand at inside centre.

Williams was set to win his fourth cap for Wales against Ireland in the 2020 Six Nations, having been named on the bench, but was injured in training and subsequently ruled out of the remainder of the tournament.

On 17 January 2023, Williams was recalled by Wales, and selected for the 2023 Six Nations squad. Williams came off the bench on 4 February 2023 in the opening match against Ireland, the same fixture he was due to play in three years prior, and more than five years after his last cap.

References

External links

Scarlets Profile
Leicester Tigers Profile

Welsh rugby union players
Llanelli RFC players
Scarlets players
1992 births
Living people
Rugby union players from Neath
Leicester Tigers players
Wales international rugby union players
Rugby union fly-halves
Rugby union centres
Gloucester Rugby players
NTT DoCoMo Red Hurricanes Osaka players
Worcester Warriors players
Ospreys (rugby union) players